Eglītis (Old orthography: Eg(g)li(h)t; feminine: Eglīte) is a Latvian surname, derived from the Latvian word for "spruce" (egle). Individuals with the surname include:

Anšlavs Eglītis (1906–1993), Latvian writer, journalist and painter
Hilda Vīka-Eglīte (1897–1963), Latvian artist and writer
Jānis Eglītis (1961–2013), politician
Viktors Eglītis (1877–1945), writer and art theorist
Zane Eglīte (born 1984), basketball player

Latvian-language masculine surnames